The Soundtrack from Dane Cook's Tourgasm was released in 2007 on Rhino Records. The album features rock tracks from mostly unsigned and/or indie talent.[] Every other track however are comedy tracks by the Tourgasm cast (Dane Cook, Jay Davis, Gary Gulman, Robert Kelly) pulled directly from the show.

Track listing

Dane Cook albums
2007 soundtrack albums
Television soundtracks
Rhino Records compilation albums